A Separation (lit. 'The Separation of Nader from Simin; also titled Nader and Simin, A Separation) is a 2011 Iranian drama film written and directed by Asghar Farhadi, starring Leila Hatami, Peyman Moaadi, Shahab Hosseini, Sareh Bayat, and Sarina Farhadi. It focuses on an Iranian middle-class couple who separate, the disappointment and desperation suffered by their daughter due to the egotistical disputes and separation of her parents, and the conflicts that arise when the husband hires a lower-class caregiver for his elderly father, who suffers from Alzheimer's disease.

A Separation won the Academy Award for Best Foreign Language Film in 2012, becoming the first Iranian film to win the award. It received the Golden Bear for Best Film and the Silver Bears for Best Actress and Best Actor at the 61st Berlin International Film Festival, becoming the first Iranian film to win the Golden Bear. It also won the Golden Globe for Best Foreign Language Film and the Asia Pacific Screen Award for Best Feature Film. The film was nominated for the Academy Award for Best Original Screenplay, making it the first non-English film in five years to achieve this.

Plot
Nader, Simin, and their 11-year-old daughter, Termeh, are a secular, middle-class family living in a flat in Tehran. Simin wants the whole family to leave Iran and has prepared the visas, but Nader wishes to stay to care for his father, who lives with them, and has Alzheimer's disease. Simin therefore files for divorce, but the family court considers the grounds to be insufficient and rejects the application. Simin moves back to her parents’ home and Termeh stays with her father.

Nader hires Razieh, a deeply religious woman from a poor and distant suburb, to take care of his father during the day. She comes each day with her young daughter, Somayeh. She soon finds that she cannot cope, in particular because the old man has become incontinent. One day, when Razieh and Somayeh are busy, he slips out and wanders in the street. Razieh hastens out and dodges through the traffic to get to him.

The next day, Nader and Termeh come home early and discover the old man lying unconscious on the floor in his bedroom, tied to the bed. Razieh and Somayeh are out. When they return, Razieh says she had some urgent personal business; Nader accuses her of neglecting his father and stealing some money (which Simin had in fact used to pay some movers). When Razieh refuses to leave until he pays her, he pushes her out of the flat. She apparently falls down some steps. Nader and Simin later learn that Razieh has suffered a miscarriage.

If Nader knew of Razieh's pregnancy and caused the miscarriage, he could be guilty of murder. There is now a series of claims and counter-claims before a criminal judge: on one side, Nader, with Simin and Termeh; on the other, Razieh and her husband, Hodjat. He is a hot-tempered man, embittered and humiliated by the loss of his long-time job as a cobbler, and harassed by creditors. More than once, he attempts to assault Nader.

Razieh says that Nader knew of her pregnancy because he heard a conversation in the flat between her and Termeh’s tutor, in which the tutor recommended a doctor to her. Nader denies this, and the tutor gives evidence in his support. Termeh finds reasons to believe this is not true, and Nader at last admits to her that he has lied for her sake and his father’s: he cannot go to prison. The tutor withdraws her evidence. To protect her father, Termeh tells the judge that he did not know of the pregnancy until she told him.

Nader claims that when he pushed Razieh out of the flat, she could not have fallen down the steps, but would have been protected by the railing. Razieh confesses to Simin that when she went out to bring back the old man, she was hit by a car and was in pain that night; this was the day before Nader pushed her, and she had gone out that day to see a doctor.

Hodjat is violent, and Simin fears for Termeh’s safety. Simin persuades Nader to make a payment to Hodjat, but Nader first asks Razieh to swear on the Qur'an that he is the cause of her miscarriage. She cannot do so. Hodjat cannot force her, and begins hitting himself in a rage.

Later, at the family court, Nader and Simin are granted a divorce. As the film ends, they wait separately outside the court while Termeh tells the judge which parent she chooses to live with.

Cast

Production
The concept came from a number of personal experiences and abstract pictures which had been in Asghar Farhadi's mind for some time. Once he decided to make the film, about a year before it premiered, it was quickly written and financed. Farhadi described the film as the "logical development" from his previous film, About Elly. Like Farhadi's last three films, A Separation was made without any government support. The financing went without trouble much thanks to the success of About Elly. The production was granted  in support from the Motion Picture Association's APSA Academy Film Fund.

In September 2010, Farhadi was banned from making the film by the Iranian Ministry of Culture and Islamic Guidance, because of an acceptance speech held during an award ceremony where he expressed support for several Iranian film personalities. Notably he had wished to see the return to Iranian cinema of Mohsen Makhmalbaf, an exiled filmmaker and Iranian opposition profile, and of the imprisoned political filmmaker Jafar Panahi, both of whom had been connected to the Iranian Green Movement. The ban was lifted in the beginning of October after Farhadi claimed to have been misperceived and apologized for his remarks.

Release

The film premiered on 9 February 2011 at the 29th Fajr International Film Festival in Tehran. Six days later it played in Competition at the 61st Berlin International Film Festival. Farhadi had previously competed at the festival's 2009 edition with About Elly, for which he had received the Silver Bear for Best Director. A Separation was distributed in Iran through Filmiran. Distribution rights for the United Kingdom were acquired by Artificial Eye.

Box office
As of 17 April 2014, A Separation has grossed worldwide over $24 million on an estimated budget of $800,000, making it a box-office success.

Critical reception
The film has been met with universal acclaim from film critics. It currently holds a 99% "fresh" rating on Rotten Tomatoes, based on 176 reviews with an average rating of 8.90/10. The website's critical consensus states, "Morally complex, suspenseful, and consistently involving, A Separation captures the messiness of a dissolving relationship with keen insight and searing intensity", as well as a score of 95 on Metacritic based on 41 reviews, making it the best-reviewed film of 2011.

Deborah Young of The Hollywood Reporter wrote from the Berlinale:

Young noted how Farhadi portrayed Iran's social and religious divisions, and complimented the film's craft:

In a strongly positive review from Screen Daily, Lee Marshall wrote:

Alissa Simon from Variety called it Farhadi's strongest work yet and described it:

David Thomson for The New Republic wrote:

The film won the Fajr Film Festival's Crystal Simorghs for Best Director, Best Screenplay, Best Cinematographer and Best Sound Recorder. It also received the Audience Favourite Film award. It won the top award, the Golden Bear for Best Film, at the 61st Berlin International Film Festival. The actress ensemble received the Silver Bear for Best Actress, and the actor ensemble the Silver Bear for Best Actor. In addition it received the Competition Prize of the Ecumenical Jury and the Berliner Morgenpost Readers' Prize. Isabella Rossellini, the Jury president of the Berlin International Film Festival, said that the choice of Farhadi's film for the Golden Bear was "pretty unanimous". Farhadi commented that he never would have thought he would win the Golden Bear, and that the film's victory offered "a very good opportunity to think of the people of my country, the country I grew up in, the country where I learned my stories – a great people". Ahmad Miralaii, the director of Iran's Farabi Cinematic Foundation, said that "Iranian cinema is proud of the awards", as he welcomed Farhadi at the airport upon the director's return from Berlin.

A Separation was voted the second best film of 2011 in the annual Sight & Sound critic poll, as well as in the LA Weekly Film Poll 2011. The film was also voted No. 3 in the annual indieWire critic survey for 2011, No. 4 in the 2011 poll by Film Comment, and was ranked No. 5 on Paste magazine's 50 Best Movies of 2011. Roger Ebert ranked the film No. 1 on his The Best Films of 2011 list and wrote: "A Separation will become one of those enduring masterpieces watched decades from now".

Iranian critic Massoud Farasati, whose views are close to those of the Islamic regime, said "The image of our society that A Separation depicts is the dirty picture westerners are wishing for".

Industry reaction 
Steven Spielberg stated he believed the film to be the best of that year by a wide margin. Other admirers of the film included Woody Allen who called Farhadi to congratulate him on the film. David Fincher, Meryl Streep, Brad Pitt, and Angelina Jolie spoke to Farhadi during the awards season each offering their praise for him and the film.

Top ten lists
The film has appeared on numerous critics' top ten lists for 2011, some notable of which are the following:

1st: Roger Ebert, Chicago Sun-Times
1st: Joe Morgenstern, The Wall Street Journal
1st: Peter Rainer, The Christian Science Monitor
1st: Mike D'Angelo, Freelance
1st: Nathaniel Rogers, The Film Experience
1st: Kristy Puchko, The Film Stage
1st: A. A. Dowd, Time Out Chicago
2nd: Alison Willmore, The A.V. Club
2nd: Andrea Gronvall, Chicago Reader
2nd: Oliver Lyttelton, The Playlist
2nd: Chuck Bowen, Slant
2nd: David Fear, Time Out New York

2nd: Peter Martin, Twitch
2nd: Tom Hall, Sarasota Film Festival
3rd: Marjorie Baumgarten, Austin Chronicle
3rd: Noel Murray, The A.V. Club
3rd: Scott Tobias, The A.V. Club
3rd: Peter Bradshaw, The Guardian
3rd: Rene Rodriguez, Miami Herald
3rd: Dave McCoy, MSN Movies
3rd: Nick Schager, Slant
3rd: Peter Howell, Toronto Star
4th: Ray Greene, Boxoffice Magazine
4th: Owen Gleiberman, Entertainment Weekly

Sight & Sound magazine included the film in its list of "30 great films of the 2000s". A Separation was later named the ninth-greatest film of the 21st century in a 2016 BBC critics' poll. In 2018 the film was ranked 21st in the BBC's list of The 100 greatest foreign language films of all time. In 2019, The Guardian ranked the film 36th in its 100 best films of the 21st century list.

Awards and nominations

 Each date is linked to the article about the awards held that year wherever possible.

References

External links
 (US)

2011 films
2011 drama films
2010s legal drama films
2010s pregnancy films
Iranian drama films
2010s Persian-language films
Films directed by Asghar Farhadi
Asian Film Award for Best Film winners
Best Foreign Language Film Academy Award winners
Best Foreign Film César Award winners
Best Foreign Language Film Golden Globe winners
Best Foreign Film Guldbagge Award winners
Independent Spirit Award for Best Foreign Film winners
Films set in Tehran
Golden Bear winners
Films about Alzheimer's disease
Films shot in Tehran
Films about divorce
Films whose director won the Best Directing Crystal Simorgh
Films whose writer won the Best Screenplay Crystal Simorgh
Crystal Simorgh for Audience Choice of Best Film winners
Sony Pictures Classics films